The discography of Faye Wong, one of the leading stars of Chinese pop music, includes 20 studio albums and 5 extended plays (EP).

Wong began recording when she was a high-school student in China, releasing six albums during these years, including many cover versions of hits by Teresa Teng. In 1989, she began her official recording career in Hong Kong with Cinepoly Records. They gave her the stage name Wong Jing Man along with an English pseudonym, Shirley Wong, which was the title of her debut album. In 1997 she signed a 5-album recording contract with EMI.  Cinepoly held one final set of recordings for another album but released these in stages on two EPs and on compilation albums, sometimes in competition with new studio releases from EMI. To date, Wong's official record companies have released more than two dozen compilations.

Many albums only have official titles in Chinese, and varying translations for some album and song names appear in the media.

Studio albums

Juvenile albums
 1985.03: 風從那裏來 (Where the Wind Comes)
(reissued in 2003 by Focus Music Ltd.)
 1985.10: 迷人的卡勒 (Magic Carillon)
(reissued in 2003 by Focus Music Ltd.)
 1985.12: 記得我 (Remember Me)
 1986: 鄧麗君故鄉情 (Teresa Teng's Hometown Love)
 1987: 舞會上的皇后 (Dancing Queen)
 1987: 迷人小姐 – 王菲珍藏集 (Miss Charm – Wang Fei Collection)
(reissued in 2004 by Guangdong Freeland Film Co Ltd.)

Major studio albums

Live albums

Remix album

Extended plays

Singles

Soundtrack

Compilations

Box sets

Other appearances

Video albums

Concert tour videos

Music video compilations

References

External links

Discography
Discographies of Chinese artists
Pop music discographies